Hakimabad (also Romanized as Ḩakīmābād) is a village in Sabzdasht Rural District, in the Central District of Bafq County, Yazd Province, Iran. At the 2006 census, its population was 18, in 8 families.

References 

Populated places in Bafq County